Enrique "Kike" Pérez Muñoz (born 14 February 1997) is a Spanish professional footballer who plays as a midfielder for Real Valladolid.

Club career
Born in Gálvez, Toledo, Castilla–La Mancha, Pérez joined Rayo Vallecano's youth setup in 2013, from EFB Odelot Toletum. He made his senior debut with the reserves on 30 August 2015, starting in a 1–1 Tercera División away draw against CDA Navalcarnero.

Pérez scored his first senior goal on 11 September 2016, scoring his team's second in a 5–0 home routing of Alcobendas CF. The following 9 August, he signed a two-year contract with Segunda División side CD Lugo, being immediately loaned to farm team CCD Cerceda for one year.

On 4 August 2018, Pérez was loaned to Real Valladolid's reserves for one year. On 14 June of the following year, he signed a permanent four-year contract with the Blanquivioletas.

Pérez made his first team – and La Liga – debut on 20 June 2020, coming on as a second-half substitute for Matheus Fernandes in a 0–1 loss at Atlético Madrid. On 11 August, he renewed his contract until 2025 and was definitely promoted to the main squad.

Pérez scored his first professional goal on 3 December 2021, netting his team's second in a 2–3 away loss against SD Huesca in the Segunda División. The following 1 February, he was loaned to Elche CF back in the top tier, with a buyout clause.

Career statistics

References

External links
 
 
 

1997 births
Living people
Sportspeople from the Province of Toledo
Spanish footballers
Footballers from Castilla–La Mancha
Association football midfielders
La Liga players
Segunda División players
Segunda División B players
Tercera División players
Rayo Vallecano B players
CD Lugo players
Real Valladolid Promesas players
Real Valladolid players
Elche CF players
Spain youth international footballers